Lac Ste. Anne is a settlement in central Alberta, Canada, within Lac Ste. Anne County.

It is located on the southern shore of Lac Ste.

See also 
Lac Ste. Anne Mission
Lac Ste. Anne Pilgrimage
List of communities in Alberta
List of settlements in Alberta

Localities in Lac Ste. Anne County